USS LST-537 was a  in the United States Navy during World War II. She was transferred to the Republic of China Navy as ROCS Chung Ting (LST-203).

Construction and commissioning 
LST-537 was laid down on 27 October 1943 at Missouri Valley Bridge and Iron Company, Evansville, Indiana. Launched on 31 December 1943 and commissioned on 2 February 1944.

Service in the United States Navy 
During World War II, LST-537 was assigned to the Asiatic-Pacific theater. She then participated in the Invasion of Normandy from 6 to 25 June 1944. She was assigned to occupation and China from 2 to 22 January 1946.

She was decommissioned on 29 May 1946 and struck from the Naval Register, 12 March 1948.

Service in the Republic of China Navy 
She was acquired and commissioned into the Republic of China Navy on 29 May 1946 and renamed Chung Ting (LST-203).

Chung Hai was decommissioned on 12 March 1989.

Awards 
LST-537 have earned the following awards:

 China Service Medal (extended)
American Campaign Medal
European-Africa-Middle East Campaign Medal (1 battle star)
Asiatic-Pacific Campaign Medal
World War II Victory Medal
Navy Occupation Service Medal (with Asia clasp)

Citations

Sources 
 
 
 
 

LST-491-class tank landing ships
Ships built in Evansville, Indiana
World War II amphibious warfare vessels of the United States
LST-491-class tank landing ships of the Republic of China Navy
1944 ships